Casa de Isla Negra was one of Pablo Neruda's three houses in Chile. It is located at Isla Negra, a coastal area of El Quisco commune, located about 45 km south of Valparaíso and 96 km west of Santiago. It was his favourite house and where he and his third wife, Matilde Urrutia, spent the majority of their time in Chile. Neruda, a lover of the sea and all things maritime, built the home to resemble a ship with low ceilings, creaking wood floors and narrow passageways. A passionate collector, every room has a different collection of bottles, ship figureheads, maps, ships in bottles, and an impressive array of shells, which are located in their own "Under the Sea" room.

Neruda fell in love with the house upon visiting the area and requested an advance from his original publisher Carlos George-Nascimento, who provided him with the money for the purchase. Neruda originally intended the house to be used as a meeting point for writers, and dedicated the place to Nascimento as a token of his gratitude.

Neruda and Urrutia are buried there.

In English, Isla Negra means "Black Island," which refers to a rock outcropping nearby, however Isla Negra is not an island. During the winter, the area is subject to heavy rains, which inspired Neruda to write his Oda a la Tormenta ("Ode to the Storm"). Isla Negra was also Neruda's inspiration for many other poems.

The house is now a writer's home museum, managed by the Pablo Neruda Foundation, and has become a popular tourist destination.

See also
 La Chascona
 La Sebastiana

External links
  Pablo Neruda Foundation's Site on Isla Negra 
  Casa de Isla Negra
 Pablo Neruda's Grave

Houses of Pablo Neruda
Isla Negra
Isla Negra
Literary museums in Chile
Biographical museums in Chile
Historic house museums in South America
Coasts of Valparaíso Region